Parliamentary elections were held in the Trust Territory of the Pacific Islands on 19 January 1965.

Background
Constitutional changes for the Trust Territory were made by an order from the US Secretary of the Interior on 28 September 1964. A bicameral Congress was established, with a 12-member House of Delegates (later renamed the Senate) with two members from each of the six districts and a 21-member General Assembly (later renamed the House of Representatives) with seats apportioned to each district based on their population – five from Truk, four from the Marshall Islands and Ponape, three from the Mariana Islands and Palau and two from Yap. This replaced the previous Council of Micronesia, which had been based outside the Trust Territory in Guam.

Future elections were to be held every two years in November of even-numbered years, with all members of the General Assembly and half the House of Delegates renewed at each election. In the 1965 elections, half the Delegates (one from each district) were elected for a term ending in January 1967 (following the 1966 elections) and the other half elected for a term ending in January 1969 (following the 1968 elections).

Campaign
A total of 94 candidates contested the elections, of which 28 were running in the House of Delegates elections, with six running in both Palau and Ponape, and four in  the Marshalls, Marianas, Truk and Yap. Although voting was meant to take place even where there was only one candidate, a misunderstanding led to Bethwel Henry being returned unopposed without a vote.

Results
Of the 41,473 people thought to be eligible to vote, 35,506 registered to do so. Of these, 25,079 people voted.

Elected members

House of Delegates

General Assembly

Aftermath
Following the elections, Tosiwo Nakayama was elected as the President of the House of Delegates.

On 15 October 1965 Dwight Heine resigned from Congress to become District Administrator of the Marshall Islands. A by-election was held in February and April 1966 which was won by Ekpap Silk. Smart Lampson died on 13 June 1966; Naosy Pitiol was appointed to complete his term by the Acting Truk District Administrator.

References

1965 elections in Oceania
1965 in the Trust Territory of the Pacific Islands
Elections in the Federated States of Micronesia
Elections in the Marshall Islands
Elections in Palau
Elections in the Northern Mariana Islands
January 1965 events in Oceania